Falsimargarita glaucophaos is a species of sea snail, a marine gastropod mollusk, in the family Calliostomatidae within the superfamily Trochoidea, the top snails, turban snails and their allies.

Description
The size of the shell varies between 6 mm and 15 mm. The shell contains, besides the smooth protoconch, 3½ rounded whorls.

Distribution
This species occurs in South Africa (country).

References

External links
 Barnard (1963), Deep sea Mollusca from west of Cape Point, South Africa; Annals of the South African Museum v. 46 407–452, 11figs.
 

Calliostomatidae